Wayne Reinagel (born May 7, 1961) is an American author and graphic artist, primarily known for his historical fiction novels.

Biography
Reinagel was raised and still lives in Collinsville, Illinois, in the United States.

Career
Reinagel is the author/illustrator of the Pulp Heroes and Modern Marvels series of pulp adventure novels and short stories.  As the artist of the books, he has provided seventy-five full-color interior illustrations featuring faux covers of non-existent magazines, mimicking the style of art from the pulp era.

A member of the Pulp Factory writers and artists group, Reinagel's classic pulp revival novels and short stories are being published by Knightraven Studios.

In early 2011, Reinagel was nominated for the "Writer of the Year" Award by the membership of PulpArk, an Arkansas-based pulp convention. His novel Pulp Heroes – Khan Dynasty was also nominated for "Best Novel," "Best Cover Art," and "Best Interior Illustrations." Pulp Heroes – Khan Dynasty was also nominated for "Best Novel" by the members of the Pulp Factory, awarded at the Windy City Pulp and Paperback Convention in Chicago each spring.

Pulp Heroes series

Beginning in 2007, Reinagel began writing a multi-volume series of Steampulp fiction novels, short stories, and anthologies. The books are set in the 1930s and 1940s, but include a series of flashbacks that date as far back as 1800. The first Pulp Heroes trilogy of novels are subtitled More Than Mortal, Khan Dynasty, and Sanctuary Falls. Each volume of the series stands alone as a single adventure or the books can be read together as an ongoing, continuous narrative in which the characters grow and change. These novels are the first published works in the Steampulp genre, a combination of classic Victorian era Steampunk and the 1930s −1940's heroic Pulp Fiction. Steampulp was a description first coined by Reinagel during a 2008 interview, while describing the premise of the Pulp Heroes novels that involve several generations of heroes spanning a period of time from the early 1800s through 1949.

Modern Marvels series

Following the more traditional Steampunk outline, Modern Marvels – Viktoriana is a combination of Gothic horror and action adventure set in the year 1888, and features a wide assortment of real-life characters appropriate to the time period, including Jules Verne, Mary Shelley, H.G. Wells, Bram Stoker, Sir Arthur Conan Doyle, H. Rider Haggard, Edgar Allan Poe, Nikola Tesla and Harry Houdini. Two further Modern Marvels novels are slated for publication in 2011.

Bibliography
Novels
 Pulp Heroes – More Than Mortal (Knightraven Studios, 2008), 
 Pulp Heroes – Khan Dynasty (Knightraven Studios, 2010), 
 Pulp Heroes – Sanctuary Falls (Knightraven Studios, 2017), 
 Modern Marvels – Viktoriana (Knightraven Studios, 2011), 
 Modern Marvels – Gothika (forthcoming, 2018)

Short stories
 Pro Se Presents #3 (Pro Se Publications, 2011), 
 The Hunter Island Adventure (Knightraven Studios, 2013), 
 The Inner World Adventure (Knightraven Studios, 2013), 
 The Cast Away (Knightraven Studios, 2014), 
 The Pulp Heroes Anthology Series – Book 1 (Knightraven Studios, 2010), 

Poem
 The Scarlet Dragon's Tale (Knightraven Books, 2007)

Others
 The Art of WAR – Volume 1 (Knightraven Studios, 2011), 
 The Art of WAR – Volume 2 (forthcoming, 2011)
 250 Funniest Office Jokes, Memos & Cartoon Pinups Volume 1 (K&R Books 1993), 
 250 Funniest Office Jokes, Memos & Cartoon Pinups Volume 2 (K&R Books 1995),

External links
 Official website
 
 Audio Podcast interview by Art Sippo at the Book Cave
 Audio Podcast interview on Khan Dynasty by Ric Croxton and Art Sippo at the Book Cave
 Audio Podcast interview on Modern Marvels by Ric Croxton and Art Sippo at the Book Cave
 Interview with Pulp Ark site on Pulp Heroes
 Interview with All-Pulp site on Modern Marvels – Viktoriana

People from Collinsville, Illinois
Novelists from Illinois
American historical novelists
1961 births
Living people
American male novelists
21st-century American novelists
21st-century American male writers